Minook Creek (variation Mynook Creek; native name, Klanarkakat, meaning "creek suitable for small boats") is a waterway in the U.S. state of Alaska. It is named after John Mynook Pavaloff, a half-Russian/half-native Alaskan, who found gold in the river's valley in 1894.

Geography
Minook Creek empties into the Yukon River just east of Rampart. It flows in a northerly direction through a deep valley whose width varies from a few hundred feet to about a half mile. The creek receives a number of large tributaries from the east— Hunter, Little Minook, Little Minook Junior, Hoosier, Florida, Chapman—and a number of others. From the west, it receives Montana, Ruby, Slate, and Granite creeks and a few small tributaries.

Just below the mouth of Slate Creek the Minook spreads into a number of branches in a wide gravel flat. This flat, which is typical of many Alaskan streams, is probably due to a change in the grade of the creek. The stream here is unable to carry the gravels of the swifter water above, and so spreads them upon the flat. Here are found the so-called "winter glaciers," which sometimes last through the short summers. In 1904, a quarter or half acre of ice still remained when the September frosts occurred. This ice owes its origin to the fact that the channel which carries the water is greatly contracted by freezing in the fall. The resulting hydrostatic pressure cracks the ice and the water overflows and freezes. This process is repeated until a considerable thickness of ice is accumulated.

The valley is V-shaped in cross section, and the eastern slope is often benched, while the western is more abrupt and has remnants of benches at but few places. A small remnant of the same bench is found on the north side of the mouth of Montana Creek and another on the north side of the mouth of Ruby Creek. The last two benches show no gravel. On the west side of the creek but few remnants of benches are found. It seems probable that all of the benches of Minook Creek may be more or less closely correlated with the benches of the Yukon. No gravel has yet been found upon the benches of intermediate height, but further investigation may show its presence.

The north side is a long, gentle slope with a greater rise in the upper part, while the south side is steep and the stream flows near its base. The asymmetry of this part of the valley is repeated in Eureka, Pioneer, Hutlina, Omega, New York, California, and many other creeks of the region whose valleys lie in parallel or nearly parallel directions. The rocks in the upper part of the valley are mostly closely folded slates and limestones. Garnetiferous schists occur at Ruby Creek, and greenstones form the bed rock of the lower valley except near the mouth, where they are partly covered by the Kenai rocks.

The muck thickens toward the sides while the bed rock remains about level.

References

Bibliography

Rivers of Alaska
Rivers of Yukon–Koyukuk Census Area, Alaska
Rivers of Unorganized Borough, Alaska